The ONOS (Open Network Operating System) project is an open source community hosted by The Linux Foundation. The goal of the project is to create a software-defined networking (SDN) operating system for communications service providers that is designed for scalability, high performance and high availability.

History 

On December 5, 2014, the Open Networking Lab (ON.Lab) along with other industry partners including AT&T and NTT Communications released the ONOS source code to start the open source community. On October 14, 2015, the Linux Foundation announced that ONOS had joined the organization as one of its collaborative projects.

The project was started around October 2012 under the leadership of Pankaj Berde, an architect at ON.Lab. The name ONOS was coined around end of 2012 by Berde. Early prototype was shown on April, 2013 at Open Networking Summit (ONS) and journey of initial iterations featured at ONS 2014.

Technology overview 

The software is written in Java and provides a distributed SDN applications platform atop Apache Karaf OSGi container. The system is designed to operate as a cluster of nodes that are identical in terms of their software stack and can withstand failure of individual nodes without causing disruptions in its ability to control the network operation.

While ONOS leans heavily on standard protocols and models, e.g. OpenFlow, NETCONF, OpenConfig, its system architecture is not directly tied to them. Instead, ONOS provides its own set of high-level abstractions and models, which it exposes to the application programmers. These models can be extended by the applications at run-time. To prevent the system from becoming tied to a specific configuration or control protocol, any software in direct contact with protocol-specific libraries and engaging in direct interactions with network environment is deliberately isolated into its own tier referred to as a provider or a driver. Likewise, any software in direct contact with intra-cluster communication protocols is deliberately isolated into its own tier referred to as a store.

The platform provides applications with a number of high-level abstractions, through which the applications can learn about the state of the network and through which they can control the flow of traffic through the network. The network graph abstraction provides information about the structure and topology of the network. The flow objective is a device-centric abstraction that allows applications to direct flow of traffic through a specific device without the need to be aware of the device table pipeline. Similarly, the intent is a network-centric abstraction that gives application programmers the ability to control network by specifying what they wish to accomplish rather than specifying how they want to accomplish it. This simplifies application development and at the same time provides the platform with added degrees of freedom to resolve what would normally be considered conflicting requests.

Applications (core extensions) can be loaded and unloaded dynamically, via REST API or GUI, and without the need to restart the cluster or its individual nodes. ONOS application management subsystem assumes the responsibility for distributing the application artifacts throughout the cluster to assure that all nodes are running the same application software. ONOS base distribution contains over 175 applications, which fall into numerous categories, e.g. traffic steering apps, device drivers, ready-to-use YANG models, utilities, monitoring apps.

The system provides REST API, CLI and an extensible, dynamic web-based GUI. gRPC interfaces for ONOS are under active development.

Use cases 

The ONOS software has been used as a platform that applications have been written on top of or has been integrated into other projects.  A number of use cases demonstrate how the software is being used today—including global research networking deployments, multilayer network control, and central office re-designed as a datacenter.

Releases 
The following lists the different ONOS releases that are all named after different types of birds in alphabetical order:

Members 
There are two tiers of membership for ONOS: Partner and Collaborator, with varying levels of commitment.

 Partners
 AT&T
 China Unicom
 Ciena
 Cisco
 Comcast
 Deutsche Telekom
 Ericsson
 Fujitsu
 Google
 Huawei
 Intel
 NEC
 Nokia
 NTT Communications
 Radisys
 Samsung Electronics
 Türk Telekom
 Verizon

 Collaborators
 AARNET
 ADARA Networks
 Airhop Communications
 Akamai
 AmLight
 BlackDuck
 BTI Systems
 Beijing University of Posts and Telecommunications
 Cavium
 ClearPath Networks
 CNIT
 CREATE-NET
 Criterion Networks
 CSIRO
 ECI Telecom
 ETRI
 Consortium GARR
 GEANT
 Happiest Minds
 Internet2
 INSPIRE group
 KAIST
 KREONET
 KISTI
 NAIM Networks
 NetCracker
 OpenFlow Korea
 OPLink Communications
 Open Networking Foundation
 Postech
 SRI International
 National Chiao-Tung University

See also 
 List of SDN controller software

References

External links 
 

Computer networking
Linux Foundation projects